The 1917 Kalamazoo football team represented Kalamazoo College during the 1917 college football season.  In Ralph H. Young's 5th year as head coach, Kalamazoo regressed from their undefeated record the year prior to a 5–5 record, and was outscored 225 to 184 by their opponents.

Schedule

References

Kalamazoo
Kalamazoo Hornets football seasons
Kalamazoo football